Cristian Onetto (born 11 February 1983) is a Chilean Rugby Union footballer. He plays as a fly-half or centre. 
He made his debut for Chile at the age of 19 in 2002 during the IRB World Cup Qualifiers.
He currently plays for COBS in Chile after previously playing for Stade Domontois (Domont) in France, Adus (Spain) and Old Reds (Chile).

http://www.rugbiers.cl

External links

1983 births
Living people
Chilean rugby union players
Rugby union fly-halves
Rugby union centres
Chile international rugby union players
Chilean expatriate rugby union players
Chilean expatriate sportspeople in France
Expatriate rugby union players in France
Sportspeople from Santiago